The Men's 10m Air Rifle Standing SH1 shooting event at the 2004 Summer Paralympics was competed  on 19 September. It was won by Jonas Jacobsson, representing Sweden.

Preliminary

19 Sept. 2004, 09:00

Final round

19 Sept. 2004, 12:30

References

M